Robinson Bay Archeological District is a national historic district and archaeological site located near  Massena in St. Lawrence County, New York.

It was listed on the National Register of Historic Places in 1977.

References

Historic districts on the National Register of Historic Places in New York (state)
Archaeological sites in New York (state)
Historic districts in St. Lawrence County, New York
National Register of Historic Places in St. Lawrence County, New York